"Underground" is a song written and recorded by David Bowie for the soundtrack of the 1986 film Labyrinth. It reached No. 21 in the UK Singles Chart.

Details and background 
Bowie wrote and recorded five songs for Labyrinth, in which he also starred as Jareth, the king of the goblins. "Underground" is the film's theme song; a slower, re-scored version by composer Trevor Jones plays over the opening credits whilst Bowie's original version plays during the end credits. Explaining his choice of musical style for the song, Bowie said: "The film essentially deals with a girl's emotions and what she's going through, discovering about herself and her parents and her relationship to her family. So I wanted something very emotional, and for me the most emotional music I can think of is gospel."

Bowie and producer Arif Mardin recorded "Underground" at Atlantic Studios in New York. The track included a large chorus of backing vocalists including Chaka Khan, Luther Vandross and Daphne Rubin-Vega, along with the Radio Choir of the New Hope Baptist Church.

Lead guitar was played by blues guitarist Albert Collins, whose contribution to the song was described by Bowie as "a very savage, rough, aggressive sound which goes against some of the maybe superficial slickness of the synthesizers."

Video 
Steve Barron directed the promotional video clip for the song, which was filmed at Shepperton Studios over two days in 1986. The video portrays Bowie as a nightclub singer who walks into an ominous alleyway where he encounters various puppet creatures from Labyrinth, including characters such as Hoggle and the Junk Lady. Bowie turns into a cartoon figure, stepping into an animated underground world. Before his descent there is a brief montage of numerous past images of Bowie, including musical personae from Ziggy Stardust to Jazzin' for Blue Jean and his film characters from The Man Who Fell To Earth and The Hunger. 

Labyrinth director Jim Henson was impressed enough with Barron's style to offer him a job directing the pilot episode of The Storyteller. Though Bowie was not heavily involved in promoting the film, Henson was nonetheless grateful for the "Underground" video, saying, "I think it's the best thing he could have done for the film." Bowie was not happy with the video, saying in 1987, "I've found that the videos I put into other people’s hands have always been a mistake. Because of my lack of interest, I didn't get that involved with things like 'Underground' which I did for Labyrinth. I just left it up, and the result is just not my kind of video. I was a bit lax there. I didn't feel involved." Despite Bowie's dislike for the video, Entertainment Weekly and Esquire considered it to be among his best after he died in 2016.

According to Screen Rant, the video can be interpreted as "background and lore to Bowie's character" Jareth, showing an origin story "of how he was an ordinary man that wandered into the Underground (the world of Labyrinth), and became the Goblin King."

Reception 
Sean Stangland of the Daily Herald described "Underground" as a "pop ballad that climaxes in a gospel celebration." Similarly describing the song as "a joyous rave-up that starts out as synth-pop before transitioning to a gospel barnstormer", David Brusie of The A. V. Club noted that it had a similar production style to Bowie's 1983 Motown-influenced song "Modern Love". Brusie also wrote that "Underground" is "distinctly American-sounding, making for a striking ending" to Labyrinth, as the film's story is "steeped in European influences like Alice In Wonderland and Grimm’s fairy tales."

Smooth Radio chose "Underground" as number 15 on its ranking of Bowie's 20 greatest songs. Newsweek considered it the strongest song on the Labyrinth soundtrack, a view shared by Screen Rant, which considered "Underground" as one of "the 10 best movie theme songs from the 80s".

Follow-up singles 
"As the World Falls Down" was considered for a Christmas 1986 single release, but was canceled. "Magic Dance" was released as the second single from the soundtrack to limited countries in January 1987.

Track listing 
All tracks by Bowie

7" Commercial Single/12" Promo Single: EMI / EA 216 (UK) 
 "Underground (Edited version)" – 4:25
 "Underground (Instrumental)" – 5:40
This is the only Instrumental version featuring the backing singers.
All other Instrumental versions are slightly longer, backing-tracks only except on the back of the promo 12-inch single.

12" Club Single: EMI / 12EA 216 (UK) 
 "Underground (Extended dance mix)"   – 7:51
 "Underground (Dub)" – 5:59
 "Underground (Instrumental)" – 5:54

 Additional production and Re-mix by Steve Thompson and Michael Barbiero.

7" Picture Disc: EMI / EAP 216 (UK) 
 "Underground (Edited version)" – 4:25
 "Underground (Instrumental)" – 5:52

Download: EMI / iEA 216 (UK) 
 "Underground (Edited version)" – 4:25
 "Underground (Extended dance mix)"   – 7:51
 "Underground (Instrumental of album version)" – 5:54
 "Underground (Dub)" – 5:59

 released in 2007

Personnel 
 David Bowie – vocals, backing vocals, producer
 Arif Mardin – producer
 Albert Collins – guitar
 Steve Ferrone – drums
 Robbie Buchanan – keyboards, synthesizer
 Bob Gay – saxophone
 Chaka Khan – background vocals
 Cissy Houston – background vocals
 Fonzi Thornton – background vocals
 Luther Vandross – background vocals

Charts

Weekly charts

Year-end charts

References 

Bibliography

External links 
 

Labyrinth (1986 film)
1986 singles
1986 songs
David Bowie songs
Songs written by David Bowie
Song recordings produced by David Bowie
Music videos directed by Steve Barron
Film theme songs
Songs written for films
Gospel songs